Erlis Frashëri (born 13 May 1988) is an Albanian footballer who plays as a midfielder for KF Drenica in the Football Superleague of Kosovo.

References

1988 births
Living people
Footballers from Korçë
Albanian footballers
Association football midfielders
Association football forwards
KF Skënderbeu Korçë players
KF Teuta Durrës players
Besa Kavajë players
FK Tomori Berat players
FK Partizani Tirana players
KF Himara players
Luftëtari Gjirokastër players
KF Korabi Peshkopi players
FC Kamza players
SC Gjilani players
Kategoria Superiore players
Kategoria e Parë players
Football Superleague of Kosovo players
Albanian expatriate footballers
Expatriate footballers in Kosovo
Albanian expatriate sportspeople in Kosovo